Formosa algae is a Gram-negative, short-rod-shaped and non-motile bacterium from the genus Formosa.

References

Flavobacteria
Bacteria described in 2004